The 2017–18 season was Brighton & Hove Albion's 116th year in existence and first season in the Premier League. Along with competing in the Premier League, the club also participated in the FA Cup and EFL Cup.

The season covered the period from 1 July 2017 to 30 June 2018.

Brighton secured their Premier League status for another season on 4 May 2018 by defeating Manchester United 1–0 at home.

Players

Current squad

Out on loan

Transfers

Transfers in

Loans in

Transfers out

Loans out

Contracts

New contracts

Pre-season
Brighton & Hove Albion announced six pre-season friendlies against Crawley Town, Southend United, Norwich City, Atlético Madrid, Girona and Fortuna Düsseldorf.

Competitions

Premier League

League table

Results summary

Results by round

Matches
On 14 June 2017, Brighton & Hove Albion's fixtures were announced.

FA Cup
In the FA Cup, Albion entered the competition in the third round and were drawn at home to Crystal Palace.

EFL Cup
Brighton & Hove Albion entered the competition in the second round and were drawn at home to Barnet. An away trip in round three against AFC Bournemouth was announced.

Squad statistics

|-
! colspan=14 style=background:#dcdcdc; text-align:center|Goalkeepers

|-
! colspan=14 style=background:#dcdcdc; text-align:center|Defenders

|-
! colspan=14 style=background:#dcdcdc; text-align:center|Midfielders

|-
! colspan=14 style=background:#dcdcdc; text-align:center|Forwards

|-
! colspan=14 style=background:#dcdcdc; text-align:center| Players who have made an appearance or had a squad number this season but have left the club
|-

|}

Goalscorers
Includes all competitive matches.

Clean sheets 
Includes all competitive matches. The list is sorted alphabetically by surname when total clean sheets are equal.

Correct as of matches played on 24 February 2018

Disciplinary record

References

Brighton & Hove Albion F.C. seasons
Brighton and Hove Albion F.C.